Susan Quilliam (born 1950 in Liverpool) is a British relationship expert who specialises in love and sexuality. She works as an advice columnist, writer, broadcaster, consultant, trainer and coach. Quilliam is associated with several relationship organisations, including Relate and the Family Planning Association, and is the author of 22 books published in 33 countries and 24 languages. She revised The Joy of Sex (2008) for modern sensibilities.

Early life, education and career

Born in Liverpool in 1950, Quilliam gained her Psychology degree (BA honors Social studies) at the University of Liverpool in 1971 followed by a PGCE at Christ's College of Education in 1972. She then taught English and Personal, Health and Social Education (PSHE) in secondary and further education between 1972 and 1979 before moving to London to work in educational publishing until 1983.

In 1983 she established Jonquil Publishing (later The Chalkface Project), a publishing company specialising in Personal and Social Education, whilst concurrently working freelance as a writer on relationships and sexuality. This later part of her career developed through advice-giving work as an agony aunt to various publications including Good Housekeeping, which brought a high level media profile.

Later public career

Quilliam has been the sex and relationship advice columnist for Fabulous magazine, a Sunday supplement of The Sun, as well as resident psychologist answering patient questions for the Sexual Advice Association website.

Quilliam came to attention in both the US and UK for her rewriting of the manual The Joy of Sex in 2008. Originally published in 1972, she reworked Alex Comfort's book for a better male/female balance. She has in addition written 22 books on love and sex published in 30 counties and 21 languages; three of her books have been written for Relate and The Samaritans, with whom she works closely.

From 2003 to 2015 she was consumer correspondent columnist for, and a member of the Editorial Board of, the Journal of Family Planning and Reproductive Health Care. She is currently a Member of the Council for Sexuality and Sexual Health of the Royal Society of Medicine.

Quilliam from 2008 to 2010, co-presented a weekly radio programme, Sex in the City with Jim Davis on LBC 97.3. She has run workshops on relationships and intimacy and is on the London faculty of The School of Life, and has spoken several times at the Royal Society of Medicine on the links between relationships and health.

She was shortlisted for the Family Planning Association's Rosemary Goodchild Award for excellence in journalism, and has served as a judge for this award.

References

External links
Susan Quilliam's website

1950 births
Living people
British advice columnists
British sex columnists
British women columnists
Writers from Liverpool
The School of Life people